Deborah Ann Hopper is a costume designer who has collaborated with Clint Eastwood on 17 films over the last 20 years.

Biography
Hopper started her career as a costume designer for opera and ballet productions. She has been working in film since 1983.

Hopper has worked closely with director Clint Eastwood for more than 20 years on films. According to Hopper she typically spends several months collecting vintage items and recreating period clothes from photographs. It is all part of her minimalist philosophy towards costuming. Hopper stated, "With the work that I do with Clint, his movies are basically everyday life, so the costumes that I deal with are everyday clothes. The costumes, in a way, have to be invisible. If they show then I think it’s kind of distracting. It should be more about the story."

Filmography

Costume designer

Costume and Wardrobe Department

Awards

References

External links
 

American costume designers
Women costume designers
Living people
Year of birth missing (living people)